Victoria "Vicky" Jane Longley (born 26 October 1988 in Bromley, London) is an English actress and singer.

Early life 
Longley trained at the Italia Conti Academy in London for eight years from age eleven.

Longley played Cinderella in Bristol's 2008/09 pantomime Cinderella at the Bristol Hippodrome.

She played Emma Norton in the children's comedy Genie in the House, screened in the UK and The Netherlands on Nickelodeon, and in France on Canal J.

In 2010 she together with other members of the original cast were involved in a 3D rendition of "Genie in the House".

Television and further work 

In 2011, Longley appeared as a supporting cast member in the BBC Comedy White Van Man playing the role of "Joanne".

Filmography

References

External links
Vicky Longley website
Genie in the House

Living people
1988 births
English television actresses
Alumni of the Italia Conti Academy of Theatre Arts
21st-century English actresses
21st-century English women singers
21st-century English singers